Chainlink is a type of fencing using woven steel. It may also refer to:

 Chains, a series of linked pieces
 Chain linking, a statistical method to consistently combine two indices
 Chainlink cactus, a shrubby cactus found in arid regions of North America
 Chainlink moray eel, a moray eel from the Western Atlantic
 Chainlink (blockchain), a decentralized oracle network which provides data onto blockchains
 Chainlink, a villain in the animated television series Static Shock
 Chain-linked Lewis, a type of lifting device used by stonemasons to lift large stones
 Chain Link (film), a 2008 American drama film

See also 
 Chain link fence (disambiguation)